The Sovereign is a large five-story, 130 unit apartment building in Santa Monica, California, United States.  Built in 1928, it was designed by architect Kurt Meyer-Radon and the Anglo American Building Company in the Mission Revival-Spanish Colonial Revival styles.

The building contains primarily single apartments and one bedroom apartments, many of which are currently under rent control.

In the 1930s, the Sovereign's operation appears to have transitioned to include a more traditional hotel format with the construction of the small wing that may have contained a dining room.  The street level sign identifying the building as the “Sovereign Hotel” also dates from this era.

In Los Angeles: An Architectural Guide, David Gebhard and Robert Winter, wrote, "There was no reticence here on the part of the architect in showing how many Spanish Colonial Revival forms and details could be used."

The Sovereign Hotel was listed in the National Register of Historic Places in 1997.

References

Buildings and structures in Santa Monica, California
Buildings and structures on the National Register of Historic Places in Los Angeles County, California
Hotel buildings on the National Register of Historic Places in California
Mission Revival architecture in California
Spanish Colonial Revival architecture in California
Landmarks in Santa Monica, California
Companies based in Santa Monica, California